Hans-Ulrich Dürst (born 22 January 1939) is a Swiss former freestyle swimmer. He competed in three events at the 1960 Summer Olympics.

References

External links
 

1939 births
Living people
Swiss male freestyle swimmers
Olympic swimmers of Switzerland
Swimmers at the 1960 Summer Olympics
Sportspeople from Abidjan